Chenzhou Beihu Airport is an airport serving Chenzhou city in Hunan province, China. Its location in Tashui Village, Huatang Town, Beihu District was approved by the Civil Aviation Administration of China in January 2015. The airport construction is being overseen by the Hunan Airport Authority. Chenzhou Beihu Airport will feature a 2600m runway, a terminal with a handling capacity for 550,000 passengers and 3,000 tonnes per annum. The airport formally opened on September 16, 2021.

Airlines and destinations

See also
List of airports in China
List of the busiest airports in China

References

Airports in Hunan
Chenzhou
Airports established in 2021
2021 establishments in China